The athletics competition at the 1963 Pan American Games was held in São Paulo, Brazil.

Medal summary

Men's events

Women's events

Medal table

Participating nations

References
GBR Athletics
Results
Olderr, Steven (2003). A Statistical History 1951–1999 Pan American Games. McFarland. .